Pavel Fedyaev (born 31 July 1982, Kemerovo, Russian Soviet Federative Socialist Republic) is a Russian politician and a deputy of the 6th, 7th and 8th State Dumas. 

After graduating from the Kuzbass State Technical University in 2004, he started working as an economist at the JSC "Chernigovets". From 2005 to 2011, he worked at the holding company "Siberian Business Union" in Kemerovo and Moscow; the founder of the holding is his father entrepreneur Mikhail Fedyaev. In 2011, he was elected the deputy of the 6th State Duma from the Kemerovo Oblast constituency. Fedyaev was re-elected for the 7th and 8th State Dumas.

References

1982 births
Living people
United Russia politicians
21st-century Russian politicians
Sixth convocation members of the State Duma (Russian Federation)
Seventh convocation members of the State Duma (Russian Federation)
Eighth convocation members of the State Duma (Russian Federation)